Polyarny (masculine), Polyarnaya (feminine), or Polyarnoye (neuter) is the name of several inhabited localities in Russia.

Urban localities
Polyarny, Murmansk Oblast, a town under the administrative jurisdiction of the closed administrative-territorial formation of Alexandrovsk, Murmansk Oblast

Rural localities
Polyarny, Sakha Republic, a selo under the administrative jurisdiction of Udachny Town Under District Jurisdiction, Mirninsky District, Sakha Republic

Historical inhabited localities
Polyarny, Chukotka Autonomous Okrug, a former urban-type settlement in Chukotka Autonomous Okrug; abolished in 1995

Renamed inhabited localities
Polyarnoye, former name of the selo of Russkoye Ustye, Sakha Republic

References